Humfrid or Hunfrid (died 28 February 1051) was the archbishop of Magdeburg from 1023 until his death. He was with the court of the Emperor Henry III when, in the summer or 1040 the newly rebuilt church of Hersfeld was reconsecrated.

Notes

Sources
Bernhardt, John W. Itinerant Kingship and Royal Monasteries in Early Medieval Germany, c. 936–1075. Cambridge: Cambridge University Press, 1993.

1051 deaths
Archbishops of Magdeburg
Year of birth unknown
11th-century German bishops